Andrea Nield (born 1951) is an Australian architect who founded and was elected the first president of Emergency Architects Australia. Nield has directed major relief and reconstruction work in Aceh, Indonesia, the Solomon Islands and Victoria, Australia after natural disasters. She and her husband Lawrence Nield are directors of Studio Nield – an Architecture and Urban Design practice.

Nield has designed hospitals in Afghanistan, Hong Kong and Australia and is a joint author of "Beyond Shelter – Architecture for Crisis" and "Beyond Shelter – Architecture and Human Dignity".

She was the Australian Institute of Architects (NT) Creative Director for AusIndoArch Tropfix Student Design Workshop held in June 2014 and the AusIndoArch Conference in Darwin November 2014, Australia.

Education 
Nield was educated at the University of Sydney where she received a BSc.Arch. in 1974 and BArch with Honors in 1977.

Work 
Nield founded Emergency Architects Australia (EAA) in 2005 which has responded to natural emergencies in Aceh, Indonesia, in Sri Lanka, the Solomon Islands, in Pakistan and in Australia. EAA is associated with the French emergency architecture agency Architectes de l'urgence Foundation.

In the Solomon Islands, Nield raised the funds and organised the team to rebuild Ngari School with the local community – a prototype school to be repeated in other locations by the Solomon Islands Department of Education.

Nield led the EAA team along with BVN Architecture that planned the Temporary Village in Kinglake, Victoria after the Black Saturday bushfires and initiated the rebuilding of the award-winning Narbethong Community Hall.

Notable Projects 
 Mais Studio/Gallery, Sydney Australia – 1998
 Balmain House, Sydney, Australia – 1992
 Women's and Children’s Hospital, Afghanistan – 2003
 Aceh Housing, Aceh, Indonesia – 2005
 Ngari School, Solomon Islands – 2006
 Ultimo Community Centre, Sydney, Australia – 1990
 St Vincent's Hospital, Sydney, Sydney, Australia – 1998
 Kai Tak Children's Hospital, Hong Kong – 2011 
 Queen Mary Hospital, Hong Kong – 2013
 Kai Tak General Hospital, Hong Kong – 2014

Publications 
 Pyrmont/Ultimo Study
 Beyond Shelter – Architecture for Crisis (2011)
 Beyond Shelter – Architecture and Human Dignity (2012)
 New Kununurra courthouse

Awards 
 2008 – Australian Institute of Architects' Marion Mahony Griffin Prize for a Distinctive Body of Architecture Work

References

External links
Emergency Architects Australia (EAA)
StudioNield

Living people
1951 births
Australian women architects
21st-century Australian architects
20th-century Australian architects
New South Wales architects
20th-century Australian women